The 2002–03 season was the 79th season in the existence of AEK Athens F.C. and the 44th consecutive season in the top flight of Greek football. They competed in the Alpha Ethniki, the Greek Cup, the UEFA Champions League and the UEFA Cup. The season began on 8 August 2002 and finished on 25 May 2003.

Overview

For second season in a row with Makis Psomiadis at the wheel, who presented a very good team during the previous season. Despite the good performance in the last season, Fernando Santos resigned due to the disrupted relationship with the administrative leader of the club. Psomiadis afterwards made a decision that no one could initially believe and brought Dušan Bajević back to the wheel of AEK. The Bosnian-Greek coach accepted Psomiadis' proposal (having also received guarantees from Psomiadis that he would be protected from a portion of the fans who did not want him back) and his big return became reality. The return of Bajević received a divided reaction, as expected. Others did not want him at all in the club, others seemed to want him back due to his successful previous spell, while many seemed to viewed him strictly as a professional. Eventually, despite the problems he faced from time to time from a large portion of the crowd, in general, Bajević was able to work in the team during his first season without much trouble.

AEK Athens presented a good and spectacular team with a very good presence and in the championship they had very good intervals, however, they were relatively behind in the title race, but eventually with an incredible streak of 12 wins in the last 12 games of the league, they re-entered the race finishing third, only 2 points behind Olympiacos and Panathinaikos, who were tied in first place, with the first winning the championship.

AEK once again had the opportunity to compete in the Champions League, but only if they passed the qualifying round. In the draw, where they were among the seeded clubs, AEK were drawn with APOEL. The first match took place in Cyprus, where APOEL took the lead from the beginning of the match, with AEK waking up and in one of the best matches of his career, Vasilios Borbokis took the team by the hand and with his two personal goals put AEK in front. The score was at 1–2, until the end of the game, but the finale was shocking. APOEL equalized with a penalty at the 90th minute, but AEK in the stoppage time with a goal by Nikolaidis got the 2–3 victory. In the rematch of Athens, AEK missed several chances but the half ended without a goal. Finally, AEK took the lead at the beginning of the second half and ceremoniously took the qualification to the Champions League group stage with a second victory by 1–0. AEK were drawn in Group C with the "galacticos" of the mighty Real Madrid, the historic Italian Roma and the Belgian Genk and achieved a historic record of drawing all six of the group stage games, but failed to qualify to the next stage of the institution finishing 3rd and continued to the knock-out stage of the UEFA Cup.

AEK continued in the UEFA cup and faced the Israeli Maccabi Haifa, an opponent that was certainly up to their standards. The first match in Athens, Maccabi came in stronger and won a penalty that hit the crossbar and then the ball didn't pass the line. From there on, AEK woke up and then the game became a monologue for the Greek team that reached the score 4–0 until the 35th minute, that remained until the final whistle. In the match, Michalis Kasapis became the top Greek footballer in appearances in European matches. Also, as it turned out afterwards, the last goal of the match, scored by Theodoros Zagorakis was the last European goal scored by AEK at the Nikos Goumas Stadium, before it was demolished. In  the rematch that took place at GSP Stadium of Nicosia, the Israelis again entered the match better, winning an early penalty again and making the 1–0, but AEK took control of the match and scored 4 goals that gave not only the victory, but also a triumphant qualification. In the round of 16, AEK were against the Spanish Málaga, an opponent that was not at all easy, but was not beyond the capabilities of the Greek team. First matchat La Rosaleda Stadium, the Spaniards came on strong and missed scoring chances, but yellow-black defense stood up well and the match ended at 0–0. AEK took a very important draw in view of the continuation. The rematch of Nea Filadelfeia proved to be of historical importance, since it was the last European game at Nikos Goumas Stadium. The match did not go well for AEK, who conceded a goal in the first half and without being able to do anything to turn the situation around and the 0–1 remained until the end, ending their European campaign.

In the Cup, AEK initialy eliminated Kassandra and then easily passed through of Chalkidona. In the round of 16, he was drawn with Apollon Smyrnis, whom he also eliminated easily, and in the quarter-finals he played with Panionios, who they eliminated in a qualification that was decided in the rematch of Nikos Goumas Stadium. In the semi-finals they were placed against PAOK. First match in Nea Filadelfeia, AEK did not get a good performance and PAOK got the important victory with 0–1. In the rematch of Toumba Stadium, AEK took an early lead, bringing the aggragate score at even, but finally a goal at the end of the match gave PAOK the qualification.

A notable event of the season was the fight against Makis Psomiadis, who generally, towards the end of 2002, started to have more and more "enemies" within the club. In January In 2003, Demis Nikolaidis filed a lawsuit against Psomiadis, who had come by his house at 3 a.m. to check if the international striker was staying overnight and also for blackmail, insult and threatening his life and physical integrity, while stating that in the incident that took place outside Nikolaidis' and his wife's, Despina Vandi, house, apart from Psomiadis, some of his bodyguards were also present. Psomiadis, having lost all of the support within the club, left and AEK Athens continued with the administration of the then president of Amateur AEK, Giannis Granitsas. The season was also punctuated by the demolition of Nikos Goumas Stadium at 5 May 2003, home to AEK Athens for 73 years.

Players

Squad information

NOTE: The players are the ones that have been announced by the AEK Athens' press release. No edits should be made unless a player arrival or exit is announced. Updated 30 June 2003, 23:59 UTC+3.

Transfers

In

Summer

Winter

Out

Summer

Winter

Loan in

Summer

Loan out

Summer

Renewals

Overall transfer activity

Expenditure
Summer:  €3,900,000

Winter:  €0

Total:  €3,900,000

Income
Summer:  €0

Winter:  €0

Total:  €0

Net Totals
Summer:  €3,900,000

Winter:  €0

Total:  €3,900,000

Pre-season and friendlies

Alpha Ethniki

League table

Results summary

Results by Matchday

Fixtures

Greek Cup

First round

Second round

Round of 16

Quarter-finals

Semi-finals

UEFA Champions League

Third qualifying round

Group stage

UEFA Cup

Round of 32

Round of 16

Statistics

Squad statistics

! colspan="13" style="background:#FFDE00; text-align:center" | Goalkeepers
|-

! colspan="13" style="background:#FFDE00; color:black; text-align:center;"| Defenders
|-

! colspan="13" style="background:#FFDE00; color:black; text-align:center;"| Midfielders
|-

! colspan="13" style="background:#FFDE00; color:black; text-align:center;"| Forwards
|-

! colspan="13" style="background:#FFDE00; color:black; text-align:center;"| Left during Winter Transfer Window
|-

|-
|}

Disciplinary record

|-
! colspan="20" style="background:#FFDE00; text-align:center" | Goalkeepers

|-
! colspan="20" style="background:#FFDE00; color:black; text-align:center;"| Defenders

|-
! colspan="20" style="background:#FFDE00; color:black; text-align:center;"| Midfielders

|-
! colspan="20" style="background:#FFDE00; color:black; text-align:center;"| Forwards

|-
! colspan="20" style="background:#FFDE00; color:black; text-align:center;"| Left during Winter Transfer window

|-
|}

Starting 11

References

External links
AEK Athens F.C. Official Website

2002-03
Greek football clubs 2002–03 season